NHRS may refer to:

 New Hampshire Retirement System
 Newcastle and Hunter River Steamship Company (NHRS Co.)